C-C chemokine receptor type 1 is a protein that in humans is encoded by the CCR1 gene.

CCR1 has also recently been designated CD191 (cluster of differentiation 191).

Function 

This gene encodes a member of the beta chemokine receptor family, which belongs to G protein-coupled receptors. The ligands of this receptor include CCL3 (or MIP-1 alpha), CCL5 (or RANTES), CCL7 (or MCP-3), and CCL23 (or MPIF-1). Chemokines and their receptors, which mediate signal transduction, are critical for the recruitment of effector immune cells to the site of inflammation. Knockout studies of the mouse homolog suggested the roles of this gene in host protection from inflammatory response, and susceptibility to virus and parasite. This gene and other chemokine receptor genes, including CCR2, CCRL2, CCR3, CCR5 and CXCR1, are found to form a gene cluster on chromosome 3p.

Interactions 

CCR1 has been shown to interact with CCL5.

References

Further reading

External links 
 
 

Chemokine receptors
Clusters of differentiation